Quezon, officially the Municipality of Quezon, is a 1st class municipality in the province of Bukidnon, Philippines. According to the 2020 census, it has a population of 109,624 people.

History

Early history
Before the ranching settlers arrived in Quezon in the early 20th century, this mountainous and bucolic land was inhabited by the nomadic Manobo tribe. These natives lived mostly along the banks of the Pulangui River, around the edges of thickly-forested hills or near lush watersheds of which Quezon is abundantly blessed with.

Contemporary period
After the Second World War, an influx of migrants from other parts of the country began arriving in Quezon. The opening of a bridge over the Pulangui River in the early 1960s increased the pace of migration even more.

The original name of the municipality per Executive Order No. 199 dated November 18, 1965, was Upper Pulangui, in which the appointed mayor was Crispin C. Bernadas.

On June 18, 1966, Republic Act No. 4802 was enacted by the House of Congress under the sponsorship of the then Congressman Cesar M. Fortich, which act was entitled "An Act Creating The Municipality Of Quezon in The Province of Bukidnon," with the Seat of Government in the present site of Kiokong.

On June 21, 1969, Republic Act 5961 was passed by the Philippine Congress, amending Republic Act 4802 "An Act Creating the Municipality of Quezon in the Province of Bukidnon" with the seat of government at Salawagan. This act however, was not implemented, for on June 19, 1971, another Act - RA 6240 was passed transferring again the site from Salawagan to Kiokong.

Geography
The municipality of Quezon is located at the southern portion of the province of Bukidnon.

Quezon with its large chunks of fertile plains, inland valleys and virgin forest, rolling hills and mountain ranges, is bounded in the south by the municipality of Kitaotao; north by the city of Valencia; west by the municipality of Maramag and Don Carlos and east by the municipality of San Fernando.

The municipality of Quezon has a total land area of 71,128.00 hectares per CAD 895-D with 31 barangays. It represents 6.78% of the total land area of the province of Bukidnon.

Drainage/Water Systems
The biggest body of water found in the municipality is the Pulangui River. This is one of the exit paths of drainage systems in urban areas to prevent stagnation of waters during heavy rain.

Boxed Culverts, ripraps and other structures are constructed over and around river crossings in so that the people can safely traverse places around bodies of water and communities are kept safe from flashfloods even when the river levels rise due to natural weather phenomena. These solutions contribute to a fairly dry and safe municipality.

Climate

The Philippine Atmospheric Geographical and Astronomical Service Administration (PAGASA) classified the climate of Quezon into the category of the first type. The dry and wet seasons are pronounced throughout the year. The warmest months are February, March and April. The rainy months are June, July, August and September. It is on the month of January that Quezon populace experience the coldest nights.

Barangays

Quezon is politically subdivided into 31 barangays.

Demographics

In the 2020 census, the population of Quezon, Bukidnon, was 109,624 people, with a population density of 154 people per square kilometer when based on the total Municipal land area of 71,128.00 hectares (711.28 square kilometers). Moreover, when based on the total Alienable and Disposable (A&D) land area of 20,878 hectares (208.78 square kilometers), the density is bigger at 525 people per square kilometer.

In the 2010 census, the municipality of Quezon had a total population of 94,584 people, up from 74,141 in 1995 mid-decade Census of Population and 82,567 in the Census of Population for the year 2000. It showed an average annual growth rate of 2.20%.

Population by mother tongue

Economy

Industries (and/or companies) presently operating in the municipality includes:

BUSCO Sugar Milling Company
BUSCO Refinery
BUSCO Organic Fertilizer Processing
Small Scale Grains Processing
Loom Band Factory
Cattle Raising
Hog Raising
Poultry Raising

Banking & Finance
There are three commercial banks in the municipality serving the needs of the people. These are the Dumaguete City Development Bank at BUSCO, Butong, Quezon, Bukidnon Cooperative Bank and One Network Bank at Poblacion. The banks accept deposits and extend loans particularly to sugarcane planters for agricultural and business purposes.

Tourism

The municipality has the following scenic spots that can attract and visited by the local and international tourist:
 The Lowan-lowan Spring Resort has an abundant flow of water that can be best enjoyed at any time. Located in the heart of the municipality.
 The Blue Water Cave, in the side of the mouth of Pulangi River.
 The Overview Nature and Culture Park, located in Palacapao, is one of the "must see" spot in the municipality. With an overlooking view that views all the land area of Quezon and its neighboring municipalities.
 The Kiokong White Rock Wall, the centerpiece of Kiokong Tourism Park, is the site of the first vertical bivouac adventure in the Philippines. With the assistance of a local outfitter, guests climb the 550-foot rock wall using Single Rope Technique until they reach a ledge 500 feet off the ground. After spending the night on the ledge, they abseil back to the ground.
 The Kiokong Tourism Park also has a bolted crag for sport climbing.

Infrastructure

Transportation

Quezon is a land-locked municipality wherein the only means of transportation is by land. It is accessible in two routes from Cagayan de Oro to Davao City. The first one is taking the route via BUSCO and the second one is taking the route via Maramag. The bus company plying the route Cagayan de Oro to Davao City and vice versa is only Bachelor Express/RTMI.

Utilities
Water Supply
The waterworks system of the municipality was constructed and operated by the municipal government through the Municipal Mayor's Office - Economic Enterprise Division. It serves the barangay of Poblacion, Libertad, Salawagan, Mibantang, Cebole, Manuto, Pinilayan and Kiburiao with more or less 2,000 individual household connections (Level III). While the other barangays with tappable spring were also developed and have provided them potable water supply.

Power / Electricity
Quezon is part of the service area of First Bukidnon Electric Cooperative, Inc. (FIBECO, INC.) since 1978. Out of the 51 barangays, 49 were energized at present. The rest were provided by the Local Government Unit with generator sets.

Communication
There are five existing communication system linking the municipality to the parts of the country. These are the SOTELCO, PLDT, GLOBE, SMART and DOTC-Telof. Several internet cafes are also thriving in the Poblacion to cater the digital needs of the constituents.

References

External links

 [ Philippine Standard Geographic Code]
Philippine Census Information
Quezon:Sugarlandia of Bukidnon

Municipalities of Bukidnon
Populated places on the Rio Grande de Mindanao